Shailesh R Singh  is an Indian film producer known for his works exclusively in Hindi cinema. In his 12-year career span, he has produced both commercially & critically acclaimed films.

Career 
Shailesh R Singh has produced films like Tanu Weds Manu.  He has also produced films like Shahid, Madaari, Aligarh & Omerta.  Shailesh Singh has supported & worked with filmmakers like Manish Jha, Bejoy Nambiar, Hansal Mehta and Aanand L Rai in their early professional days.

In 2019, the films produced under Singh's production house, Karma Media  And Entertainment & Paramhans Creations, are: Jabariya Jodi, starring Sidharth Malhotra and Parineeti Chopra, and Judgementall Hai Kya, a black comedy starring Rajkummar Rao and Kangana Ranaut.
Both are produced in association with Balaji Motion Pictures.

An upcoming romantic 
film Hurdang directed by Nikhil Nagesh Bhatt is being produced by him under his banner of Karma Media and Entertainment. The film features Sunny Kaushal, Nushrat Bharucha and Vijay Varma in the lead roles. The filming commenced on 6 July 2019.

Filmography

Awards 
Shahid
 National Film Award for Best Actor 2014 Rajkummar Rao
 National Film Award for Best Direction 2014 Hansal Mehta
 Filmfare Critics Award for Best Actor 2014 Rajkummar Rao
 Screen Award for Best Screenplay 2014 Hansal Mehta, Apurva Asrani, Sameer Gautam Singh
 Screen Award for Best Dialogue 2014 Sameer Gautam Singh
 Guild Award for K.A. Abbas Honour for Social Consciousness Through Cinema 2014

Tanu Weds Manu
 Filmfare RD Burman Award for New Music Talent 2012 Krsna 
 Zee Cine Award for Best Actress in a Supporting Role 2012 Swara Bhaskar
 Guild Award for Best Actor in a Comic Role 2012 Deepak Dobriyal
 Guild Award for Best Cinematography 2012 Chirantan Das

Tanu Weds Manu Returns
 National Film Award for Best Actress 2016 Kangana Ranaut
 Filmfare Award for Best Dialogue 2016 Himanshu Sharma
 Guild Award for Best Actor in a Comic Role 2016 Deepak Dobriyal
 National Film Award for Best Screenplay 2016 Himanshu Sharma
 Filmfare Critics Award for Best Actress 2016 Kangana Ranaut
 IIFA Award for Best Performance in a Comic Role 2016 Deepak Dobriyal
 BIG Star Most Entertaining Comedy Film 2015 Anand L. Rai
 Screen Award for Best Comedian 2016 Deepak Dobriyal
 BIG Star Most Entertaining Actor in a Comedy Film - Male 2015 Deepak Dobriyal

References 

https://newslivetv.com/kangana-ranaut-starrer-thalaivi-finally-gets-a-release-date

Indian film producers
Living people
Year of birth missing (living people)